Bergens Social-Demokrat was a Norwegian newspaper, published in Bergen.

It was started on 15 May 1922 as an organ for the Social Democratic Labour Party of Norway, who broke away from the Labour Party in 1921. From 1 April 1924 it was published daily, but in 1925 it reverted to being published twice a week. The newspaper went defunct in 1927, the same year as the Social Democratic Labour Party re-merged with Labour. The last editor, from 1926 to 1927, Gunnar Ousland, subsequently became editor of a new Labour newspaper, Bergens Arbeiderblad.

References

1922 establishments in Norway
1927 disestablishments in Norway
Defunct newspapers published in Norway
Newspapers published in Bergen
Newspapers established in 1922
Norwegian-language newspapers
Publications disestablished in 1927
Social Democratic Labour Party of Norway newspapers